Albanus may refer to:

 Alba Longa, an ancient city near Rome in Italy
 St. Alban, soldier who became a Christian martyr 
 Alban Hills, southeast of Rome were known as Albanus Mons to the Romans, and Lago Albano in the Alban Hills was called Albanus Lacus
 Albanus Glacier, located in Antarctica near the Tapley Mountains
 Galeas Albanus, a ship from Äpplö in Åland that sailed in the Baltic Sea during the early 20th century or the replica built 1986-1988

See also
Albinus (disambiguation)
Albania (disambiguation)
Albanian (disambiguation)
Albanians (disambiguation)